The expectation fulfilment theory of dreaming, proposed by psychologist Joe Griffin in 1993, posits that the prime function of dreams, during REM sleep, is to act out metaphorically non-discharged emotional arousals (expectations) that were not expressed during the previous day. It theorises that excessive worrying (regarded as unintentional misuse of the imagination) arouses the autonomic nervous system, which increases the need to dream during REM sleep. This deprives the individual of the refreshment of the mind and body brought about by regenerative slow-wave sleep.

REM sleep
Everyone has periods of rapid eye movement (REM) sleep every night, a phase lasting about 90 minutes. This is when most dreaming occurs. Overall, REM sleep usually accounts for up to two hours of sleep time and most people can remember their dreams only if woken directly from REM sleep.

It is known from laboratory studies of brain waves that, just before entering REM sleep and while in it, powerful electrical signals pass through the brain. On electroencephalogram recordings, these appear as spikes and are known as PGO spikes, after the initials of names of the structures of the brain they pass through. These same spikes occur during waking, when attention is drawn to a stimulus, the phenomenon being known as ‘the orientation response’. While sleeping, the spikes appear to represent the cue to dream.

Dream research
Joe Griffin discovered, from years of research on his own dreams and those of others, that dreams are metaphorical enactments of emotional arousals that were not expressed or acted out during the day. This is nature’s evolutionary solution to animals’ need to inhibit arousals, such as anger, urge to eat or urge to mate, whenever such instincts are inappropriate or dangerous to act on at the time; the arousals are safely deactivated later in dreams. In civilised societies, of course, people are commonly in circumstances where strong feelings are aroused but it is inappropriate to act on them. Arguments do not feature in dreams, as the emotion is expressed; private worries, fears, urges not given into (such as for a forbidden food or activity) do. Griffin has theorised that by enabling arousals to be safely discharged in dreams, once they have been activated, REM sleep serves to keep our instincts and drives intact. (If continually activated but not acted upon in any form, they would gradually become extinct.) The PGO spike activity prior to and during dreaming signals that there is material to be acted out and discharged. Once the instinct patterns have been deactivated, the data processing potential of the neocortex is released, ready to deal with the emotionally arousing contingencies of the following day. Far from dreams being the cesspit of the unconscious, as Freud proclaimed, Griffin says that they are the equivalent of the flushed toilet.

Dreaming in metaphor
Metaphor is the language of the REM state. French scientist Michel Jouvet suggested that REM sleep is concerned with programming the central nervous system to carry out instinctive behaviours. William Dement and colleagues discovered that the amount of REM sleep a foetus or newborn has depends on how mature an animal is at birth. Animals born relatively mature have little REM sleep as foetuses and after birth, while animals born immature have a considerable amount. During REM sleep, foetuses and newborns are programmed with the instincts that they must seek to complete in the environment. As the sense organs start to receive inputs from the environment, the brain ‘pattern matches’ to the instinctive templates programmed in during REM sleep. According to the theory, just as programming instincts involves creating a pattern or template for which an analogue can be found in the environment (twig-like materials, a friendly human face, etc.), so it makes sense that deactivation also uses sensory analogues or metaphors, enabling the brain to draw on images which represent the unexpressed emotional arousals of the day.

Griffin has posited another, more important reason for why dreaming is in metaphor. Using an analogous experience as a means of completing an arousal enables the arousal associated with the instinctive urge to be discharged but, importantly, the instinctive urge itself in the context it was experienced can be remembered. This prevents memory stores from becoming either corrupt or incomplete. It also explains why it is important to forget dreams most of the time.

Dreaming and depression
It is well known that depressed people spend far more of their sleep time in REM sleep than non-depressed people, entering it earlier – and it has been shown, experimentally, that depressed people show improvement when deprived of REM sleep. This accords with Griffin’s theory, as depressed people spend much of their waking time arousing themselves physiologically through rumination and worry. All this arousal has to be discharged in dreams. Dreaming takes up a large amount of the brain’s energy, as the PGO spikes are continually firing, so depressed people tend to wake early but exhausted and lacking in motivation, setting the scene for more worry and distress the following day. (This has been termed the cycle of depression.) The expectation fulfilment theory of dreaming is used by Human Givens therapists to help people see the need to stop worrying and introspecting and to focus on productive ways to meet unmet needs instead.

Conclusions
While the theory has widely been validated anecdotally, through people’s personal experience, it is not able to be put to rigorous scientific testing, as interpretations of dream events are necessarily subjective. However, Griffin, by tracking through historical data, claims that the expectation fulfilment theory of dreaming provides a far more plausible explanation for two famous dreams interpreted by of Freud and Jung.

Objectively, the theory fulfils the criteria for a satisfactory explanation of dreaming put forward by eminent sleep researcher Professor Bill Domhoff in a special issue of Behavioral and Brain Sciences, devoted to examining the most commonly promoted dream theories. Professor Domhoff, who did not consider the expectation fulfilment theory of dreaming in his review, wrote:
If the methodologically most sound descriptive empirical findings were to be used as a starting point for future dream theorising, the picture would look like this:
 Dreaming is a cognitive achievement that develops throughout childhood;
 There is a forebrain network for dream generation that is most often triggered by brainstem activation;
 Much of dream content is coherent, consistent over time and continuous with past or present emotional concerns.

He also concluded that none of the theories he had reviewed encompassed all three of these "well-grounded" conclusions.

References

External links
The Dream Problem

Dream
Psychological theories